Edward Adams was a British boxer. He competed in the 1908 Summer Olympics.

References

Boxers at the 1908 Summer Olympics
British male boxers
Olympic boxers of Great Britain
Year of birth missing
Year of death missing
Featherweight boxers
20th-century British people